

 
Ghan is a locality in the Northern Territory of Australia located about  south of the territory capital of Darwin at the intersection of Lasseter Highway and Stuart Highway.

Naming
The locality’s name is given in "recognition of the important role the Afghans and their camels played in opening up Central Australia."  It fully surrounds both the locality of Finke and the community of Imanpa.  Its boundaries and name were gazetted on 4 April 2007.

Heritage listed sites
Ghan includes the following places that have been listed on the Northern Territory Heritage Register – the Charlotte Waters Telegraph Station, the Henbury Meteorite Craters, the Illamurta Springs Conservation Reserve, the Mac Clark (Acacia peuce) Conservation Reserve and the Old Andado Station.

Governance
Ghan is located within the federal division of Lingiari, the territory electoral division of Namatjira and the local government area of the MacDonnell Region.

Demographics
The 2016 Australian census which was conducted in August 2016 reports that Ghan had 124 people living within its boundaries.

References

Notes

Citations

Populated places in the Northern Territory
MacDonnell Region